An anticestodal agent is a drug used in deworming to combat tapeworm infection. It derives its name from Cestoda.

Examples include:
 albendazole
 albendazole sulfoxide
 dichlorophen
 niclosamide
 quinacrine

References

See also 
 Taeniacide

Antiparasitic agents